Assier is a railway station in Assier, Occitanie, France. The station is on the Brive-Toulouse (via Capdenac) railway line. The station is served by Intercités de nuit (night train) and TER (local) services operated by SNCF.

Train services
The following services currently call at Assier:
night services (Intercités de nuit) Paris–Orléans–Figeac–Rodez–Albi
local service (TER Occitanie) Brive-la-Gaillarde–Figeac–Rodez

See also 

 List of SNCF stations in Occitanie

References

Railway stations in Lot (department)
Railway stations in France opened in 1862